Rachael Ann Soutar (born 8 April 1994) is an Australian association football player, who played for Sydney FC and Western Sydney Wanderers in the Australian W-League.

Early life
Soutar attended Pymble Ladies' College.

Career

Sydney FC

Western Sydney Wanderers
In 2012, Soutar was named as in the Western Sydney Wanderers squad for their inaugural W-League season. She left Western Sydney Wanderers ahead of the 2016–17 W-League season.

Return to Sydney FC
Soutar returned to Sydney FC ahead of the 2017–18 season.

References

External links

1994 births
Living people
Australian women's soccer players
Sydney FC (A-League Women) players
Western Sydney Wanderers FC (A-League Women) players
Women's association football defenders
People educated at Pymble Ladies' College